CCTV-1 (CCTV General Channel) is the primary channel of CCTV, the national flagship terrestrial television network of the People's Republic of China. It broadcasts a range of programs from CCTV Headquarters at East 3rd Ring Road in Beijing and is available to both cable and terrestrial television viewers. The terrestrial signal of CCTV-1 is free-to-air across China. However, due to copyright restrictions, the satellite signal of CCTV-1 is encrypted, and smartcards are necessary for decryption.

History

Peking Television (2 May 195830 April 1978)
Initially branded as Peking Television (not to be confused with the present-day Beijing Television), CCTV-1 was launched on an experimental basis on 2 May 1958 and officially regular broadcasting for 4 hours 30 minutes each day starting on 2 September 1958. Peking Television was granted a free-to-air terrestrial television broadcasting license in the 1960s. It began broadcasting experimentally in colour in 1971 and was later launched via satellite transmissions in 1973 for major events. The first color programs were PAL-D/K, and full-time color broadcasting began in 1977.

China Central Television (1 May 1978present)
On 1 May 1978, Peking Television was renamed China Central Television (CCTV) with the approval of the Central Committee of the Chinese Communist Party. CCTV began domestic satellite transmissions in 1984 using the Song Dang Hong 2 satellite. In 1988, it began stereo broadcasting on all television channels. In 1994, it moved satellite broadcasting from Chinasat-3 to Chinasat-4, a quality-level broadcaster. It turned on its digital signal in 2002. CCTV-1 began broadcasting 24 hours a day on 1 October 2004 and began high-definition broadcasting on 28 September 2009. On 1 March 2011, Hong Kong's Asia Television (ATV) started relaying CCTV-1 instead of CCTV-4, a Hong Kong-based free-to-air digital terrestrial station that is usually tuned to 15 on the UHF band. On 29 May 2017, Hong Kong's RTHK started relaying CCTV-1 instead of CGTN Documentary, a Hong Kong-based free-to-air digital terrestrial station that is usually tuned to 33 on the high-definition television.

Transmission hours

2 September 195830 April 1978: 19:00–22:30 Beijing Time
1 May 197827 January 1987: 09:00–13:00 and 17:00–23:30 Beijing Time
28 January 198728 February 1993: 08:25–23:50 Beijing Time
1 March 199331 March 1994: 06:50–01:00 Beijing Time
1 April 19944 May 1997: 06:00-01:58 (06:00–01:12 on Wednesday) Beijing Time
5 May 19977 July 2001: 05:55–02:00 Beijing Time
8 July 200130 April 2003: 05:55–01:45 Beijing Time
1 May 200315 June 2003: 24 hours a day
16 June 200312 August 2004: 05:55–02:10 Beijing Time
13 August 2004 29 August 2004: 05:55–05:00 Beijing Time
30 August 20045 September 2004: 24 hours a day
6 September 200426 September 2004: 05:55–02:25 Beijing Time
27 September 200430 September 2004: 05:55–03:10 Beijing Time
1 October 2004present: 24 hours a day

High-definition

CCTV-1 HD is a simulcast network version of CCTV-1 in high-definition. All standard-definition content is upscaled to high-definition output. The rest of the programming hours consist of mainly upscaled resolution CCTV-1 simulcast. The horizontal resolution was increased to 1920 pixels. CCTV-1 HD was created specifically for the 2008 Summer Olympics and the 2008 Summer Paralympics at the Beijing National Stadium. For the duration of the 2012 Summer Olympics broadcasting was increased to 24 hours a day to provide extra coverage of the Summer Olympic Games events.

Hong Kong and Macau version

A re-compiled edition of CCTV-1 started broadcasting in Hong Kong and Macau on 1 March 2011, and relaunched on digital terrestrial television on 29 May 2017.

Due to copyright and law restrictions, commercial advertisements, some television dramas, and some entertainment shows are not aired on CCTV-1 Hong Kong and Macau versions.

References

External links
 Official Site 

China Central Television channels
Television channels and stations established in 1958
1958 establishments in China